David N. Ratnavale (born 1928) is a Sri Lankan-born psychiatrist who specializes in disaster relief on which he advises the Sri Lankan president.

Ratnavale graduated from the University of Ceylon and in 1973 was the first Western-trained psychiatrist invited to China. 
He was the chairman of Human Disaster Management council of Sri Lanka. Dr Ratnavale had his primary and secondary education in Trinity College, Kandy where he won The Ryde Gold Medal for the best all round boy in 1947.

As of 2015, he was in private practice in Bethesda, Maryland.

References

Living people
Sri Lankan psychiatrists
1928 births
Alumni of Trinity College, Kandy